Urgench State University (UrSU) is a major university in Urgench, Uzbekistan established by the decree of the President of the Republic of Uzbekistan Islam Karimova dated 1 September 1992 in the city of Urgench. The university is commonly known as Urgench University (in Uzbek Urganch universiteti)

History
The university was initially organized in 1942 as the Khorezm State Pedagogical Institute. In 1991–2017, the university was named after great mathematician  and philosopher Al-Khorezmi (alternative transliteration Muhammad ibn Musa al-Khwarizmi) as Urgench State University after named Al-Khorezmi.

In 2017, the Urgench State University after named Al-Khorezmi was finally renamed the Urgench State University, a name it keeps to date. The rector of the university  is Dr.  Bakhrom Ismoilovich Abdullayev since 2016.

At present, there are 12 faculties and 39 departments. The university provides 74 Bachelor programs; 27 Master programs; 39 Doctoral programs, 5 joint bachelor programs; 6 joint master programs.  The total number of teaching staff working at the university is 826, including 211 doctors of sciences (DSC), professors and PhDs.

Faculties  
Currently, the university comprises the following faculties:

 Physics and Mathematics
 Pedagogic
 Art
 History
 Philology
 Foreign Philology
 Tourism and Economics
 Technique
 Chemical Technique
 Natural Science
 Physical Training
 Faculty of Bioengineering and Food Safety

The university enrolls 19,235 students, among them 1161 international students.

International partners 
University of Santiago de Compostella, University of Barcelona (Spain), Al-Farabi Kazakh National University, Kostanay State University named after A. Baitursynov, Caspian State University of Technology and Engineering named after Sh. Yessenov (Kazakhstan), University of Poitiries, University of Toulon (France), Vienna University of Natural Resources and Sciences(Austria), Bashkirian State University (Bashkiria), Belarusian State Technological University, Belarusian National Technical University, Mogilev State university of food technologies (Belarus), Shenyang university, Nanchang university (China), University of Copenhagen (Denmark), Ilmenau University of Technology, Weihenstephan-Triesdorf  University of Applied Sciences (Germany), University of Keele (Great Britain), University of Pisa, University of Padua, University of L'aquila, University of Florence (Italy), International University named after K. Sh. Toktomatov (Kyrgyzstan), Kumoh national institute of technology (Korea), Baltic International Academy (Latvia), Islamic Science University of Malaysia, University of Technology Malaysia (Malaysia), Adam Mickiewicz University, University named after Warmin-Mazur (Poland), University of Porto (Portugal), Research Institute of Building Physics of the Russian Academy of Architecture and Building Sciences, Institute of Mathematics and Fundamental Informatics, Siberian Federal University, Astrakhan State University of Architecture and Construction, Mordovia State University named after N.P. Ogarev, State University of Ivanovo Chemical Technologies, Medical University named after N.I. Pirogov, Ulyanovsk State Agrarian University, Moscow State Pedagogical University, Moscow State University, Belgrade State Technological University named after V.G. Shukhov,  Astrakhan State University, Russian State University of Physical Culture, Sports, Youth and Tourism, Institute of Organic Chemistry named after N. D. Zelinsky, Volgograd State Agrarian University, Altai State University, Vladimir State University named after Alexander Grigorievich and Nikolai Grigorievich Stoletov, Belgorod State Technological University, Gomel State University, Udmurtia State University (Russia), University of Lund (Sweden), Institute of Technology and Innovation Management of the city of Kulob (Tajikistan), Karamanuli Meumetbey University (Turkey), Odessa National University named after I.I. Mechnikov, Uman State Pedagogical University named after Pavel Tychin (Ukraine), California State University, Fullerton (US).

Joint programs have been established with Astrakhan State University, Astrakhan State Technical University and Astrakhan State University of Architecture and Civil Engineering (Russia), the University of Applied Sciences Weinstein-Trizdorf (Germany), Nanchang University (China), Belarus national technical university and Mogilev State University of Food Technologies (Belarus).
As university has established strong ties and collaboration with foreign universities, a lot of international projects have been implemented and are being constantly evolving at UrSU such as, CLASS, EPCA, ELBA, KOICA, IRES, 3D Digital Silk Road (Silk Road 3D), English for STEM, SUMRICA and ICM projects with the universities such as University of L’Aquila (Italy), University of Porto (Portugalia), Keel university (UK), University of Padova (Italy), University of Cantabria (Spain), Weihenstephan-Triesdorf University (Germany), University of Agricultural Sciences and Veterinary Medicine of Cluj-Napoca (Romania), University of Santiago de Compostela (Spain), University of West Attica (Greece), Poitiers University (France), University of Primorska (Slovenia), Polytechnic Institute of Bragança (Portugal), Karamanoglu Mehmetbey University (Turkey) and Pope John Paul II State school of Higher education in Biala Podaska (Poland).

See also
List of universities in Uzbekistan

References

External links
Official website

Universities in Uzbekistan